Pak Tong-chun ( or  ; born 1942) is a North Korean diplomat. He has served to postings in France (1998), Cuba (2000, 2004) and Venezuela (2003) as well as Belize (2002). He was also Vice Minister of Foreign Affairs from 1998 to 2000.

Pak's first international appointment was as vice director of the International Affairs Division of the North Korean Red Cross Society, in 1985. He went on to become representative to UNESCO in 1992.

See also
Politics of North Korea

References
Yonhap News Agency. "Who's who, North Korea," pp. 787–812 in 

North Korean diplomats
1942 births
Living people